Duryea Power Company was a manufacturer of Brass Era automobiles in Reading, Pennsylvania.  It was one of several similarly named companies that early automobile pioneer Charles Duryea was involved with.

The 1904 Duryea Straight-Line Phaeton was a phaeton model.  It could seat 2 passengers and sold for US$1350.  The slant-mounted straight-3, situated amidships of the car, produced 12 hp (8.9 kW).  The wood and iron-framed car weighed 950 lb (431 kg) and was noted for its high-speed capability. It had a 72" wheelbase.

The 1904 Duryea Tonneau was a tonneau version and could seat 5 to 7 passengers.  It sold for US$1750.  The armored wood-framed car weighed 1350 lb (612 kg). It had a 3-cylinder, 12 hp engine, a 2-speed manual transmission, and a 95" wheelbase.

See also
 Duryea Motor Wagon Company
 Duryea Motor Wagon
 Stevens-Duryea
 Charles Duryea
 Frank Duryea

References

 Frank Leslie's Popular Monthly (January, 1904)

Brass Era vehicles
Duryea
Companies based in Berks County, Pennsylvania
Defunct motor vehicle manufacturers of the United States
Motor vehicle manufacturers based in Pennsylvania